Theodore P. Beauchaine is an American psychologist and William K. Warren Foundation Professor of Psychology at the University of Notre Dame. His research focuses on neural bases of behavioral impulsivity, emotion dysregulation, and self-injurious behavior, and how these neural vulnerabilities interact with environmental risk factors (e.g., maltreatment, neighborhood violence and criminality, marginalization) across development for both boys and girls (as opposed to boys alone as in most previous research). He is among the first psychologists to specify how impulsivity, expressed early in life as ADHD, follows different developmental trajectories across the lifespan for boys vs. girls who are exposed to adversity. In contexts of maltreatment, deviant peer affiliations, and other environment risk factors, boys with ADHD are more likely to develop conduct problems, substance use disorders, and antisocial traits, whereas girls with ADHD are more likely to engage in self-injurious behavior (e.g., cutting) and develop borderline traits. In protective environments, these outcomes are far less likely. Beauchaine has received two awards from the American Psychological Association: the Distinguished Scientific Award for an Early Career Contribution to Psychology and the Mid-Career Award for Outstanding Contributions to Benefit Children, Youth, and Families.

References

External links
Faculty page

Living people
21st-century American psychologists
University of Notre Dame faculty
Portland State University alumni
Stony Brook University alumni
Year of birth missing (living people)